The 1993 Men's Ice Hockey World Championships was the 57th such event sanctioned by the International Ice Hockey Federation (IIHF). Teams representing 32 countries participated in several levels of competition, with an additional six national teams failing to advance from mid-season preliminary qualifying tournaments. The competition also served as qualifications for group placements in the 1994 competition.

The top Championship Group A tournament took place in Germany from 18 April to 2 May 1993, with games played in Munich and Dortmund. Twelve teams took part, with the first round being split into two groups of six, with the four best teams from each group advancing to the quarter finals. Russia beat the reigning world champions Sweden to win the World Championships for the first time since entering competition after the dissolution of the Soviet Union at the end of 1991. The bronze medal was won by the Czech Republic, defeating Canada in their first major tournament as an independent country after their split with Slovakia at the beginning of the calendar year.

While Latvia had last competed in 1939, this year marked the World Championship debut of three national teams. Kazakhstan, Slovenia, and Ukraine, played for the first time, in Group C.  Belarus, Croatia, Estonia, and Lithuania all did not make it out of the autumn qualifiers and had to wait at least another year. Also waiting until the following year was Slovakia, who made their World Championship debut in Group C1 in 1994.

Eleven of the twelve openings for the Lillehammer Olympics were established in Group A.  Switzerland, by being relegated, was excluded, and the final nation had to qualify in a tournament the next fall.  The top two teams from Group B, the Group C champion, the top Asian nation, and Slovakia all were given the opportunity to fill the final vacancy.

World Championship Group A (Germany)

First round

Group 1

Group 2

Playoff round

Quarterfinals

Consolation round 9–12 place

Semifinals

Consolation round 11–12 place

Switzerland was relegated to the Group B.

Third Place match

Final

World Championship Group B (Netherlands)
Played in Eindhoven 25 March to 4 April.  The British team, just promoted from Group C, won all their games.  Their first game was won by either keen strategy, or controversy, depending on how you view it.  With the score against tournament favorite Poland tied three all, the British coach, Alex Dampier, asked the referee to measure the opposing goalie's stick.  It was found to be illegal, and Great Britain scored the winning goal on the ensuing powerplay.

Great Britain was promoted to the Group A while Bulgaria was relegated to the Group C.

World Championship Group C (Slovenia)

Qualifying round
All qualifiers were played from  6 to 8 November 1992.

Group 1 (Latvia)
Played in Riga. The winner would play in Group C, the other two nations had to play each other the following year for inclusion into Group C2.

Latvia qualified for the Group C.

Group 2 (Belarus)
Played in Minsk. The top two teams moved on to Group C in the spring, last place was included in Group C1 in 1994. Azerbaijan had the option of playing in this group, but did not.

Ukraine and Kazakhstan both qualified for Group C.

Group 3 (Croatia/Slovenia)
Played as a home and home series in Zagreb and Ljubljana. The winner would go on to Group C, the loser would have to try to qualify next year for Group C2.  Originally Luxembourg was to play in this group but declined.

Slovenia qualified for the Group C.

Group 4 (Turkey)
Played in Ankara.  Originally South Africa was to be in this group as well, but they went directly to the Group C instead.

Israel qualified for Group C.

First round
Played from 12 to 18 March. The first and second place from each group of six advanced to the semifinals, and then finals, with the winner gaining promotion to the Group B. The three other semi-finalists, together with the two third place teams, would remain to form Group C1 in 1994. The remaining six nations would comprise Group C2, effectively being relegated. At the time of this tournament, the expected format for 1994 was different. South Korea beat Spain seven to three to win what was expected to be a battle to remain in the Group C. Instead, Group C was divided into two parts putting them both in the bottom tier.

Group 1
Played in Bled.

Belgium, South Korea, and Israel were relegated to the Group C2.

Group 2
Played in Ljubljana.

Australia, Spain, and South Africa were relegated to the Group C2.

Semifinals

Relegation match

Third Place match

Final

Latvia was promoted to the Group B.

Ranking and statistics

Tournament awards
Best players selected by the directorate:
Best Goaltender:       Petr Bříza
Best Defenceman:       Dmitri Yushkevich
Best Forward:          Eric Lindros
Media All-Star Team:
Goaltender:  Petr Bříza
Defence:  Ilya Byakin,  Dave Manson
Forwards:  Ulf Dahlén,  Eric Lindros,  Mikael Renberg

Final standings
The final standings of the tournament according to IIHF:

Scoring leaders
List shows the top skaters sorted by points, then goals.
Source:

Leading goaltenders
Only the top five goaltenders, based on save percentage, who have played 50% of their team's minutes are included in this list.
Source:

Citations

References

Complete results

IIHF Men's World Ice Hockey Championships
Men
World
1993
April 1993 sports events in Europe
May 1993 sports events in Europe
1990s in Munich
Sports competitions in Munich
Sports competitions in Dortmund
20th century in Dortmund
1990s in North Rhine-Westphalia
International ice hockey competitions hosted by the Netherlands
International ice hockey competitions hosted by Slovenia
March 1993 sports events in Europe
1992–93 in Dutch ice hockey
1992–93 in Slovenian ice hockey
20th century in Eindhoven
Sports competitions in Eindhoven
Sports competitions in Ljubljana
1990s in Ljubljana
Sport in Bled